The men's 200 metres event at the 2013 Asian Athletics Championships was held at the Shree Shiv Chhatrapati Sports Complex on 5–6 July.

Medalists

Results

Heats
First 3 in each heat (Q) and 4 best performers (q) advanced to the semifinals.

Wind: Heat 1: -0.4 m/s, Heat 2: -0.6 m/s, Heat 3: +1.1 m/s, Heat 4: -0.4 m/s

Semi-finals
First 3 in each heat (Q) and 2 best performers (q) advanced to the final.

Wind: Heat 1: -0.3 m/s, Heat 2: -0.1 m/s

Final
Wind: +0.7 m/s

References
Results

200 Men's
200 metres at the Asian Athletics Championships